Joleen Slijp Hakker (born 30 May 1981) is a Dutch multi-sport blind competitor who competed in adaptive rowing, Paralympic cycling and paratriathlon. She has won three medals in adaptive rowing at the World Rowing Championships and participated at the 2008 Summer Paralympics, double silver medalist in paratriathlon and participated at the 2016 Summer Paralympics.

References

1981 births
Living people
People from Soest, Netherlands
Paralympic cyclists of the Netherlands
Paratriathletes of the Netherlands
Paralympic rowers of the Netherlands
World Rowing Championships medalists for the Netherlands
Rowers at the 2008 Summer Paralympics
Cyclists at the 2012 Summer Paralympics
Paratriathletes at the 2016 Summer Paralympics
Sportspeople from Utrecht (province)
20th-century Dutch people
21st-century Dutch people